Borchert is a German language surname. It stems from the male given name Burchard – and may refer to:
Bernhard Borchert (1863–1945), Baltic-German painter
Jochen Borchert (1940), German politician
Jürgen Borchert (1940), German judge
Karl Borchert (1884), German gymnast
Katharina Borchert (1972), German journalist
Reinhard Borchert (1948), German sprinter
Rudolph Borchert (1928–2003), American screenwriter
Scott Borchert, American writer
William G. Borchert, American screenwriter and author
Wolfgang Borchert (1921–1947), German author and playwright

References

German-language surnames
Surnames from given names